"Not Enough Time" is the third single from the 1992 album Welcome to Wherever You Are by Australian rock band INXS. The song was written by Andrew Farriss and Michael Hutchence: the music in Sydney and the lyrics in Paris, France. It was released simultaneously with "Baby Don't Cry" (Europe and Australia) but only in the US, Canada (where it reached #7 on its national singles chart) and Japan.

The lyrics to the song were originally intended for another composition from Welcome To Wherever You Are, which later became the album's opening song 'Questions'. The original version can be heard on the 2002 remaster of the album.

Australian singer Deni Hines featured as a backing vocalist on the song, and went on to marry guitarist Kirk Pengilly a year later in 1993.

The song appears on the compilation album Barcelona Gold, released to coincide with the 1992 Summer Olympics.

B-sides
The B-sides include a solo composition "Firma Terror" from bassist Gary Beers, another by lead guitarist Kirk Pengilly titled "Light the Planet", and "Deepest Red", an out-take from the X album.

Track listings
 CD single 7-87437-2 ATLANTIC/US
 "Not Enough Time" (Barcelona LP Fade)
 "Light the Planet"

 CD5 maxi single 7-85819-2 ATLANTIC/US
 "Not Enough Time" (Barcelona LP Fade)
 "Deepest Red"
 "Firma Terror"
 "In My Living Room"

 CD3 single WMD5-4115 WEA/JAPAN
 "Not Enough Time" (Barcelona LP Fade)
 "Light the Planet"

 Cassette single 7-87437-4 ATLANTIC/US
 "Not Enough Time" (Barcelona LP Fade)
 "Deepest Red"

Charts

The song reached #28 on the Billboard Hot 100, the band's last top 40 hit in the States until 2005's comeback single, "Pretty Vegas".

References

1992 singles
INXS songs
Songs written by Andrew Farriss
Songs written by Michael Hutchence
1992 songs
Atlantic Records singles
Music videos directed by Howard Greenhalgh
Song recordings produced by Mark Opitz